The Global Arena is a sports venue in Munakata, Fukuoka, Kyūshū, Japan. The 10,000-capacity Sanix Global Arena Stadium is the main stadium at the Global Arena sports complex. It was set up by the President of the Sanix company Mr. Munemasa and includes various sports grounds for rugby union, soccer, tennis etc. Also there are indoor facilities for sports such as kendo, judo and tennis. The Global Arena is now a separate company from Sanix, though they are closely related.

The stadium is used mainly for rugby, has a capacity of 10,000 spectators and is the home ground of Fukuoka Sanix Blues though they have a separate clubhouse, also in Munakata. Saracens F.C. played Sanix here when they toured Japan under Buck Shelford.

Sanix World Rugby Youth Invitational Tournament

The Global Arena is the venue for the annual international high schools tournament in Golden Week between top Japanese and foreign teams from various countries. The first one was held in 2000.

Access

The nearest station at which express trains stop is Akama Station on the Kagoshima Main Line.

See also 
Munakata Sanix Blues
Sanix World Rugby Youth Tournament
Level-5 Stadium
Kintetsu Hanazono Rugby Stadium
Chichibunomiya Rugby Stadium
Honjō Athletic Stadium

References

External links 

Global Arena - home page (Japanese)
Results and schedule of Sanix World Rugby Youth Tournament 2006

Rugby union stadiums in Japan
Rugby in Kyushu
Munakata, Fukuoka